José Félix Villarreal (1956 - 5 May 2022) is a Mexican chess International Master (IM) (1980), Chess Olympiad individual gold medal winner (1980).

Biography
In 1974, José Félix Villarreal won Mexican Junior Chess Championship. In 1975, in Buenos Aires he won silver medal in Pan American Junior Chess Championship. He two times participated in World Junior Chess Championships (1973, 1975).

José Félix Villarreal played for Mexico in the Chess Olympiads:
 In 1978, at third board in the 23rd Chess Olympiad in Buenos Aires (+2, =1, -3),
 In 1980, at third board in the 24th Chess Olympiad in La Valletta (+7, =4, -0) and won individual gold medal,
 In 1982, at third board in the 25th Chess Olympiad in Lucerne (+5, =1, -6),
 In 1994, at first reserve board in the 31st Chess Olympiad in Moscow (+1, =1, -3),
 In 2000, at first reserve board in the 34th Chess Olympiad in Istanbul (+1, =2, -1).

José Félix Villarreal played for Mexico in the World Student Team Chess Championship:
 In 1977, at second board in the 22nd World Student Team Chess Championship in Mexico City (+1, =5, -5).

José Félix Villarreal played for Mexico in the World Youth U26 Team Chess Championship:
 In 1978, at second board in the 1st World Youth U26 Team Chess Championship in Mexico City (+3, =3, -4).

In 1980, José Félix Villarreal was awarded the FIDE International Master (IM) title. By profession he was construction engineer. Since 1983, José Félix Villarreal has been playing chess tournaments irregularly. He worked in the Mexican Chess Federation.

He died on 5 May 2022, after being shot in an attack on 16 March in Tijuana, where armed assailants entered the home of Patricia Susana Rivera, lawyer, human rights advocate and partner of José Félix Villarreal. Rivera was killed on the scene.

References

External links

José Félix Villarreal chess games at 365chess.com

1956 births
Chess International Masters
Mexican chess players
Chess Olympiad competitors

2022 deaths